Louise-Joséphine Sarazin de Belmont (1790–1871) was a French landscape painter and lithographer.

Life

Louise-Joséphine Sarazin de Belmont was born in Versailles in 1790.
She studied painting under Pierre-Henri de Valenciennes (1750–1819), who supplemented his income as an artist by teaching drawing to young women.
In 1812 de Valenciennes was appointed a professor at the École des Beaux-Arts, which did not admit women.
During the time of the First French Empire she was encouraged by Joséphine de Beauharnais.
After the restoration of the monarchy she became a protegee of the Duchess of Berry.

Sarazin de Belmont submitted her first paintings to the Salon in 1812.
Her Salon entries in the years that followed show that she travelled widely.
Between 1824 and 1826 she painted in Rome, Naples and Sicily, and in 1831 was in the Pyrenees.
She received the second class medal at the Salon of 1831
In 1834 she depicted the Forest of Fontainebleau.
She won a first class medal in 1834.
An 1834 dictionary of French artists listed her as a landscape artist living on the Rue Saint-Germain-des-Prés (Boulevard Saint-Germain) in Paris, where she taught pupils drawing and painting at her studio.

Sarazin de Belmont painted in Nantes and Brittany from 1836 to 1837.
She lived in Italy from 1841 to 1865, painting landscapes around Rome and views of Florence, Naples and Orvieto.
She won another medal at the Salon in 1861.
Her 1861 submission to the Salon was two paintings of the Roman Forum, one in the morning and the other in the evening.
In 1865 she returned to Paris, and submitted her last entries to the Salon of 1868 hors concours.
She died in 1871.

Works 

Many of Sarazin de Belmont's works depicted historical scenes, while others took pastoral themes.

 Vue de Saint-Pol-de-Léon, 1837, 62 cm × 90,5 cm, Musée des beaux-arts de Quimper.
Paris, vu des hauteurs du Père Lachaise, Musée des Augustins de Toulouse

Publications

References

Sources

1790 births
1871 deaths
People from Versailles
French women painters
French landscape painters
19th-century French painters
19th-century French women artists